Alexandre Bodinier (20 February 1887 – 27 January 1964) was a French racing cyclist. He rode in the 1921 Tour de France.

References

1887 births
1964 deaths
French male cyclists
Place of birth missing